Per Henriksen (15 August 1929 – 7 August 2007) was a Danish footballer. He played in 14 matches for the Denmark national football team from 1953 to 1956.

References

External links
 

1929 births
2007 deaths
Danish men's footballers
Denmark international footballers
Place of birth missing
Association footballers not categorized by position